Rajesh Gautam is an Indian politician and a member of 17th Legislative Assembly, Uttar Pradesh of India. He represents the ‘Kadipur’ constituency in Sultanpur district of Uttar Pradesh.

Political career
Rajesh Gautam contested Uttar Pradesh Assembly Election as Bharatiya Janata Party candidate and defeated his close contestant Bhageluram from Bahujan Samaj Party with a margin of 26,406 votes.

Posts held

References

Year of birth missing (living people)
Living people
Bharatiya Janata Party politicians from Uttar Pradesh
Uttar Pradesh MLAs 2017–2022
Uttar Pradesh MLAs 2022–2027